The Lithuanian White is a Lithuanian breed of general-purpose pig. It was bred for suitability to conditions in Lithuania, but spread to other parts of the Soviet Union including those that are now Belarus, Georgia, Kazakhstan, Turkmenistan and Moldova, and was also reared in parts of the Russian Republic.

In 1980 the breed numbered over a million head. In 2020 a total of 353 animals was reported to DAD-IS by Lithuania; its conservation status there is reported as "critical". The Russian Federation last reported numbers in 2003, when there were 18 200 head; conservation status there is unknown.

References 

Pig breeds originating in Lithuania
Animal breeds originating in the Soviet Union